Every Damn Time is the first studio album by the Nashville, TN rock band,  Black Diamond Heavies. It was released in 2007 under the Alive Records Label. This is Black Diamond Heavies first album as a two-man band after Mark "Porkchop" Holder left the group in 2006, after their self-released 2004 EP You Damn Right.

Track listing

References

2007 albums
Black Diamond Heavies albums
Alive Naturalsound Records albums